Sirat al-Halbiya is a book about the history of Islam in six volumes  by Islamic scholar Ali Ibn Burhan-ud-din Halabi (name also written as: Nur ad-Din al-Halabi, or, Nuraddin Halabi).

See also
List of Sunni books

References

Sunni literature